Krste Velkoski (born 20 February 1988) is a Macedonian professional footballer who plays as a striker.

Club career
Velkoski signed a three-year deal with Enosis Neon Paralimni on 18 June 2010 but his journey did not last long as Velkoski and the club mutually agreed to terminate his contract on 14 December 2010. He then signed a two-year deal with his former team Rabotnički in January 2011 and holds the record as top scorer in UEFA Club Competitions for the club.

In January 2014, Velkoski joined Bosnian Premier League club Sarajevo signing a -year contract. After Sarajevo, he played for Incheon United and Nakhon Ratchasima. In 2017, Velkoski returned to Sarajevo.

International career
He made his senior debut for Macedonia in a March 2014 friendly match against Latvia and has earned a total of 12 caps, scoring no goals. His last international was a November 2018 Nations League match against Gibraltar.

Career statistics

Club

International

Honours
Rabotnički 
Macedonian First League:  2007–08
Macedonian Football Cup: 2007–08

Sarajevo 
Bosnian Premier League: 2014–15, 2018–19, 2019–20
Bosnian Cup: 2013–14, 2018–19, 2020–21

References

External links
Profile at MacedonianFootball 

1988 births
Living people
People from Vevčani Municipality
Association football forwards
Macedonian footballers
North Macedonia youth international footballers
North Macedonia under-21 international footballers
North Macedonia international footballers
FK Rabotnički players
FK Metalurg Skopje players
CSM Ceahlăul Piatra Neamț players
Enosis Neon Paralimni FC players
FK Sarajevo players
Incheon United FC players
Krste Velkoski
Macedonian First Football League players
Liga I players
Cypriot First Division players
Premier League of Bosnia and Herzegovina players
K League 1 players
Krste Velkoski
UEFA Euro 2020 players
Macedonian expatriate footballers
Expatriate footballers in Romania
Macedonian expatriate sportspeople in Romania
Expatriate footballers in Cyprus
Macedonian expatriate sportspeople in Cyprus
Expatriate footballers in Bosnia and Herzegovina
Macedonian expatriate sportspeople in Bosnia and Herzegovina
Expatriate footballers in South Korea
Macedonian expatriate sportspeople in South Korea
Expatriate footballers in Thailand
Macedonian expatriate sportspeople in Thailand